

See also

Lists of fossiliferous stratigraphic units in Europe
Lists of fossiliferous stratigraphic units in the United Kingdom

References
 

Scotland
Stratigraphy of Scotland
Scotland geography-related lists
United Kingdom geology-related lists
Fossils of Scotland